Pope Cosmas I of Alexandria (Coptic ), 44th Pope of Alexandria & Patriarch of the See of St. Mark.

Pope Cosmas I was from the town of Abu-Sair. He later became a monk in the Monastery of Saint Macarius the Great. He was ordained Pope of Alexandria and Patriarch of the See of St. Mark, against his will, on 30 Paremhat, 445 A.M. (26 March 729)

He prayed to God to let him die and his prayers were answered when departed on 3 Paoni, 446 A.M. (28 May 730), after one year, two months and two days of his enthronement.

References

8th-century Coptic Orthodox popes of Alexandria
Coptic Orthodox saints
730 deaths
8th-century Christian saints
Year of birth unknown